James Platt may refer to:

James Platt (MP) (1823–1857), Liberal MP for Oldham
James H. Platt Jr. (1837–1894), U.S. Representative from Virginia
James Perry Platt (1851–1913), American judge
J. E. Platt (James Edward Platt), American college football coach
Jim Platt (born 1952), Northern Irish football player  
Jim Platt (basketball) (born 1952), assistant coach with the Army Black Knights